The Battle of Treiden was fought during the Polish–Swedish War (1626–1629), between Polish–Lithuanian Commonwealth and the Swedish Empire on February 1, 1628. Polish-Lithuanian Commonwealth forces under the command of Mikołaj Korff and Konstanty Zienowicz defeated the Swedish forces commanded by Gustav Horn.

References

Arvi Korhonen, Hakkapeliittain historia, Tom 2. Söderström, 1939.

Treiden 1628
Treiden 1628
Treiden 1628
1628 in Europe
17th century in Latvia
Treiden (1628), Battle of
Sigulda Municipality
Vidzeme